The 2016 Striping Technology 350 was the 21st stock car race of the 2016 NASCAR Camping World Truck Series, the second race of the Round of 6, and the 18th iteration of the event. The race was held on Friday, November 4, 2016, in Fort Worth, Texas, at Texas Motor Speedway, a 1.5-mile (2.4 km) permanent tri-oval shaped speedway. The race took the scheduled 147 laps to complete. Johnny Sauter, driving for GMS Racing, made a pass on Matt Crafton for the win with 2 laps to go, and earned his 13th career NASCAR Camping World Truck Series win, and his third of the season. Spencer Gallagher mainly dominated the race, leading 88 laps. To fill out the podium, Daniel Hemric, driving for Brad Keselowski Racing, would finish in 3rd, respectively.

Background 

Texas Motor Speedway is a speedway located in the northernmost portion of the US city of Fort Worth, Texas – the portion located in Denton County, Texas. The reconfigured track measures  with banked 20° in turns 1 and 2 and banked 24° in turns 3 and 4. Texas Motor Speedway is a quad-oval design, where the front straightaway juts outward slightly. The track layout is similar to Atlanta Motor Speedway and Charlotte Motor Speedway. The track is owned by Speedway Motorsports, Inc. Nicknamed "The Great American Speedway“ the racetrack facility is one of the largest motorsports venues in the world capable of hosting crowds in excess of 200,000 spectators.

Entry list 

 (R) denotes rookie driver.
 (i) denotes driver who is ineligible for series driver points.

Practice 
The first practice session was originally going to be held on Thursday, November 3, at 2:45 pm CST, but was postponed until Friday, November 4, due to inclement weather. The final practice session would be cancelled.

Qualifying 
Qualifying was held on Friday, November 4, at 2:45 pm CST. Since Texas Motor Speedway is at least 1.5 miles (2.4 km) in length, the qualifying system was a single car, single lap, two round system where in the first round, everyone would set a time to determine positions 13–32. Then, the fastest 12 qualifiers would move on to the second round to determine positions 1–12.

Tommy Regan, Mike Harmon, and Ryan Ellis would fail to qualify.

Full qualifying results

Race results

Standings after the race 

Drivers' Championship standings

Note: Only the first 8 positions are included for the driver standings.

References 

NASCAR races at Texas Motor Speedway
November 2016 sports events in the United States
2016 in sports in Texas